Benfluralin is an herbicide of the dinitroaniline class. The mechanism of action of benfluralin involves inhibition of root and shoot development.

It is used to control grasses and other weeds.

References

Herbicides
Anilines
Trifluoromethyl compounds
Nitro compounds
Nitrobenzenes